Ras Tanajib Airport is a small airport located in the oil complex of Tanajib about  northwest of Jubail in the Eastern Province of Saudi Arabia. The airport is 4.1 km away from the Persian Gulf and occupies an area of 3 km2.

Overview
The airport was built and being operated by the Saudi Arabian Oil Company (Saudi Aramco) to replace the old airport in Safaniya, as logistic support for the remote complex. Nowadays, it serves both Tanajib and the nearby Safaniya. It was also utilized during operation Desert storm in 1991.

Facilities
The airport has one runway, 2,440 meters long and 30 meters wide, with lights and ILS support. There are 6 parking/gates for medium-sized airplanes, many helipads can be found in the airport.

Car parking is available outside the airport gate.

Airports in Saudi Arabia